Eastern Mirror is a daily English language newspaper published from Dimapur in the Indian state of Nagaland.

History 
On 16 November 2015, Eastern Mirror along with four other state newspapers—Capi, The Morung Express, Nagaland Page and Tir Yimyim published their front page in blank to protest against a diktat from the Assam Rifles. The Assam Rifles had earlier in October ordered the editors to stop covering the rebel group—National Socialist Council of Nagaland - Khaplang (NSCN-K).

See also 
List of newspapers in Nagaland

References

External links 
Official website
Eastern Mirror on Instagram

Newspapers published in Nagaland
English-language newspapers published in India
Mass media in Nagaland
2002 establishments in Nagaland
Publications established in 2002
Dimapur